The Hoedun Line is an electrified railway line of the Korean State Railway in Tŏkch'ŏn-si, South P'yŏngan Province, North Korea, running from Ch'ŏlgisan on the Sŏch'ang Line to Hoedun.

Route 

A yellow background in the "Distance" box indicates that section of the line is not electrified.

References

Railway lines in North Korea
Standard gauge railways in North Korea